Burak Ince (born 20 January 2004) is a Turkish professional footballer who plays as a midfielder for 2. Bundesliga club Arminia Bielefeld.

Club career 
Burak Ince came through the academy of Altınordu, which produced several Turkish talents, such as Cengiz Ünder, Çağlar Söyüncü, Barış Alıcı, Berke Özer and Ravil Tagir.

Ince made his professional debuts with Altınordu on 8 August 2020 against Hatayspor, becoming the youngest ever footballer to play in the TFF First League. Nearly a month after he also became the youngest goalscorer in a 4–1 victory against Eskişehirspor, where he also delivered an assist for Anıl Koç.

He is announced to be looked at by big european clubs such as Bayern Munich, Manchester City or Leicester, while Ince stated he dreamed of playing for FC Barcelona.

In November 2021, it was announced Ince would join Bundesliga club Arminia Bielefeld in late January 2022, after his 18th birthday. He agreed a contract until 2025.

References

External links
 
 TFF Profile
 

2004 births
Living people
Sportspeople from Manisa
Turkish footballers
Association football midfielders
Turkey youth international footballers
Turkey under-21 international footballers
Altınordu F.K. players
Arminia Bielefeld players
TFF First League players
Bundesliga players
Turkish expatriate footballers
Expatriate footballers in Germany
Turkish expatriate sportspeople in Germany